Bulbophyllum pseudohydra is a species of epiphytic orchid, formerly the sole species in the monospecific genus Chaseella. It is endemic to the Honde and Haroni Valleys of Zimbabwe. It has also been reported from Kenya, although this remains to be confirmed.

References

External links
Iziko Museums of Cape Town, Biodiversity Explorer, Chaseella pseudohydra
Flora of Zimbabwe, Chaseella pseudohydra Summerh.
Swiss Orchid Foundation at Herbarium Jany Renz
Universität Wien, Chaseella pseudohydra
IOSPR orchid photos

pseudohydra
Epiphytic orchids
Endemic flora of Zimbabwe